This article is a partial list of selected Jewish ghettos created by the Nazis for the purpose of isolating, exploiting and finally, eradicating Jewish population (and sometimes Romani people) on territories they controlled. Most of the ghettos were set up by the Third Reich in the course of World War II. In total, according to USHMM archives, "The Germans established at least 1,000 ghettos in German-occupied and annexed Poland and the Soviet Union alone." Therefore, the examples are intended only to illustrate their scope across Eastern and Western Europe.

In Europe

Large Nazi ghettos in which Jews were confined existed across the continent. These ghettos were liquidated as Holocaust transports delivered their helpless victims to concentration and extermination camps built by Nazi Germany in occupied Poland.

German-occupied Poland

Following the 1939 Invasion of Poland, the new ghetto system had been imposed by Nazi Germany roughly between October 1939 and July 1942 in order to confine Poland's Jewish population of 3.5 million for the purpose of persecution, terror, and exploitation. The Łódź Ghetto was the second largest, holding about 160,000 inmates.

A more complete list of over 270 ghettos  with an approximate number of prisoners, dates of creation and liquidation, as well as known deportation routes to extermination camps, is available at Jewish ghettos in German-occupied Poland. Below, selected Nazi German designations are listed.

 Baranowicz Ghetto, today Belarus
 Będzin Ghetto, site of Będzin Ghetto Uprising
 Białystok Ghetto, site of Białystok Ghetto uprising
 Borshchiv Ghetto, today Ukraine
 Brześć (Brest-Litovsk) Ghetto, today Belarus
 Buczacz Ghetto, today Ukraine
 Brody Ghetto, today Ukraine
 Częstochowa Ghetto, site of Częstochowa Ghetto uprising
 Czortków Ghetto, today Ukraine
 Drohobycz Ghetto, today Ukraine
 Grodno Ghetto, today Belarus
 Izbica Ghetto
 Kielce Ghetto
 Kolomyja Ghetto, today Ukraine
 Kostopol Ghetto, today Ukraine
 Kraków (Krakau) Ghetto
 Łachwa Ghetto, site of Łachwa Ghetto uprising, today Belarus
 Lida Ghetto, today Belarus
 Łódź (Litzmannstadt) Ghetto
 Łomża Ghetto
 Lubartów Ghetto
 Lublin Ghetto
 Łuck Ghetto, site of Łuck Ghetto uprising and massacre, today Ukraine
 Lwów (Lemberg) Ghetto, site of Lviv pogroms, today Ukraine
 Marcinkance (Marcinkonys) Ghetto, today Lithuania
 Międzyrzec Podlaski (Mezritsh) Ghetto
 Mińsk Mazowiecki (Novominsk) Ghetto
 Mizocz Ghetto, today Ukraine
 Nowogródek (Navahrudak) Ghetto, today Belarus
 Nowy Sącz Ghetto (20 Jews assigned to one room)
 Olyka Ghetto
 Opatów Ghetto in Opatów
 Pińsk (Pinsk) Ghetto, today Belarus
 Piotrków Trybunalski (Petrikau) Ghetto
 Przemyśl Ghetto
 Radom Ghetto
 Rakaŭ Ghetto, today Belarus
 Równe Ghetto, today Ukraine
 Sambor Ghetto, see rescue by Franciscan Sisters of the Family of Mary, today Ukraine
 Siedlce Ghetto, see the November 1942 massacre at Gęsi Borek
 Słonim Ghetto, site of Słonim Ghetto uprising, today Belarus
 Sosnowiec (Sosnowitz) Ghetto, site of Sosnowiec Ghetto uprising
 Stanisławów (Stanislau) Ghetto, site of Bloody Sunday massacre, today Ukraine
 Stryj Ghetto, today Ukraine
 Tarnopol Ghetto with satellite labour camps, today Ukraine
 Tarnów Ghetto
 Trochenbrod (Zofiówka) Ghetto, today Ukraine
 Vilna (Wilno, Vilnius) Ghetto, site of Ponary massacre, today Lithuania
 Warsaw (Warschau) Ghetto, site of Warsaw Ghetto Uprising
 Zdzięcioł (Djatlowo) Ghetto, site of Dzyatlava massacre

Other countries and occupied territories 
 Annopol Ghetto, Reichskommissariat Ukraine (now Ukraine)
 Bobruisk Ghetto, Military Administration in the Soviet Union (now Belarus)
 Baia Mare Ghetto, Hungary (now Romania)
 Borisov Ghetto, Reichskommissariat Ostland (now Belarus)
 Berdichev Ghetto, Reichskommissariat Ukraine (now Ukraine)
 Berezdov Ghetto, Reichskommissariat Ukraine (now Ukraine)
 Bershad Ghetto, Romania (now Ukraine)
 Bytom (Beuthen) Ghetto, pre-war Germany (now Poland)
 Bistrița Ghetto, Hungary (now Romania)
 Bobrynets Ghetto, Reichskommissariat Ukraine (now Ukraine)
 Budapest Ghetto, Hungary
 Cehei Ghetto, Hungary (now Romania)
 Cherkasy Ghetto, Reichskommissariat Ukraine (now Ukraine)
 Chernihiv Ghetto, Military Administration in the Soviet Union (now Ukraine)
 Chișinău Ghetto, Romania (now Moldova)
 Czernowitz Ghetto, Romania (now Ukraine)
 Cluj (Kolozsvár) Ghetto, Hungary (now Romania)
 Daugavpils (Dvinsk) Ghetto, Reichskommissariat Ostland (now Latvia)
 Debrecen Ghetto, Hungary
 Dej Ghetto, Hungary (now Romania)
 Donetsk Ghetto, Military Administration in the Soviet Union (now Ukraine)
 Gomel Ghetto, Military Administration in the Soviet Union (now Belarus)
 Gorodok Ghetto, Military Administration in the Soviet Union (now Belarus)
 Kaluga Ghetto, Military Administration in the Soviet Union (now Russia)
 Kaposvár Ghetto, Hungary
 Karlovac Ghetto, Croatia
 Kovno (Kaunas) Ghetto, Reichskommissariat Ostland (now Lithuania)
 Kharkiv Ghetto, Military Administration in the Soviet Union (now Ukraine)
 Kherson Ghetto, Reichskommissariat Ukraine (now Ukraine)
 Klimovo Ghetto, Military Administration in the Soviet Union (now Russia)
 Klimavichy Ghetto, Military Administration in the Soviet Union (now Belarus)
 Klintsy Ghetto, Military Administration in the Soviet Union (now Russia)
 Kobeliaky Ghetto, Reichskommissariat Ukraine (now Ukraine)
 Košice Ghetto, Slovakia
 Liepāja Ghetto, Reichskommissariat Ostland (now Latvia)
 Mátészalka Ghetto, Hungary
 Mazyr Ghetto, Reichskommissariat Ukraine (now Belarus)
 Minsk Ghetto, Reichskommissariat Ostland (now Belarus)
 Miskolc Ghetto, Hungary
 Mogilev Ghetto, Military Administration in the Soviet Union (now Belarus)
 Mohyliv-Podilskyi Ghetto, Romania (now Ukraine)
 Monastir Ghetto, Bulgaria (now North Macedonia)
 Munkács Ghetto, Hungary (now Ukraine)
 Nyíregyháza Ghetto, Hungary
 Odessa Ghetto, Romania (now Ukraine)
 Oleksandrivka Ghetto, Reichskommissariat Ukraine (now Ukraine), first liquidation in March 1942 was where the Ivanhorod Einsatzgruppen photograph was taken.
 Olyka Ghetto, Reichskommissariat Ukraine (now Ukraine)
 Oradea Ghetto, Hungary (now Romania)
 Orsha Ghetto, Reichskommissariat Ukraine (now Belarus)
 Pochep Ghetto, Military Administration in the Soviet Union (now Russia)
 Polotsk Ghetto, Military Administration in the Soviet Union (now Belarus)
 Proskurov Ghetto, Reichskommissariat Ukraine (now Ukraine)
 Pruzhany Ghetto, Reichskommissariat Ostland (now Belarus)
 Pryluky Ghetto, Military Administration in the Soviet Union (now Ukraine)
 Pskov Ghetto, Military Administration in the Soviet Union (now Russia)
 Reghin Ghetto, Hungary (now Romania)
 Riga Ghetto, Reichskommissariat Ostland (now Latvia)
 Salonika Ghetto, German occupation zone in Greece (now Greece)
 Satu Mare Ghetto, Hungary (now Romania)
 Sfântu Gheorghe Ghetto Hungary, (now Romania)
 Shepetivka Ghetto, Reichskommissariat Ukraine (now Ukraine)
 Shumyachi Ghetto, Military Administration in the Soviet Union (now Russia)
 Šiauliai Ghetto, Reichskommissariat Ostland (now Lithuania)
 Sighet Ghetto, Hungary (now Romania)
 Skvyra Ghetto, Reichskommissariat Ukraine (now Ukraine)
 Slavuta Ghetto, Reichskommissariat Ukraine (now Ukraine)
 Slutsk Ghetto, Reichskommissariat Ostland (now Belarus)
 Smolensk Ghetto, Military Administration in the Soviet Union (now Russia)
 Snovsk Ghetto, Military Administration in the Soviet Union (now Ukraine)
 Starodub Ghetto, Military Administration in the Soviet Union (now Russia)
 Stolin Ghetto, Reichskommissariat Ostland (now Belarus)
 Švenčionys Ghetto, Reichskommissariat Ostland (now Lithuania)
 Szeged Ghetto, Hungary
 Székesfehérvár Ghetto, Hungary
 Szombathely Ghetto, Hungary
 Tarashcha Ghetto, Reichskommissariat Ukraine (now Ukraine)
 Telšiai Ghetto, Reichskommissariat Ostland (now Lithuania)
 Theresienstadt Ghetto (concentration camp, sometimes referred to as a ghetto), Protectorate of Bohemia and Moravia (now Czech Republic)
 Uman Ghetto, Reichskommissariat Ukraine (now Ukraine)
 Uzhgorod Ghetto, Hungary (now Ukraine)
 Vinnytsia Ghetto, Reichskommissariat Ukraine (now Ukraine)
 Vitebsk Ghetto, Military Administration in the Soviet Union (now Belarus)
 Žagarė Ghetto, Reichskommissariat Ostland (now Lithuania)
 Zagreb Ghetto, Croatia
 Zhitomir Ghetto, Reichskommissariat Ukraine (now Ukraine)
 Zlatopil Ghetto, Reichskommissariat Ukraine (now Ukraine)
 Zlynka Ghetto, Military Administration in the Soviet Union (now Russia)

Ghettos outside Europe 
 Shanghai Ghetto (1937-1941 Less Restriction over Jews by Japanese) (1942-1945) Japanese forced 16,000 Jews into a one square mile Ghetto, where they were often the victims of air raids by the U.S.' 7th Air Force, and often had no running water, no bathroom, heavy rations, and it was not uncommon for 30-40 people to sleep in the same room.

References

Bibliography
 

List
Ghettos